The 139th Medical Brigade, a subordinate command of the 807th Medical Command (Deployment Support), is headquartered in Independence, MO.

Subordinate units
 388th Multifunctional Medical Battalion (Hays, Kansas)
 325th Combat Support Hospital (Independence, Missouri)
 349th Combat Support Hospital (Bell, California)

References

Military units and formations of the United States Army Reserve
Medical brigades of the United States Army